Picha Autra (born January 7, 1996), is a Thai professional footballer who plays as a winger, he has also been used as a midfielder for Thai League 1 club Muangthong United.

International career

Youth
He won the Football at the 2017 Southeast Asian Games with Thailand U23.

Senior
Picha made his debut for the Thailand senior team on 21 March 2019 in Thailand's 1–0 away win over China in the 2019 China Cup. In 2021, he was called up by Thailand national team for the 2020 AFF Championship.

International goals

U23

Honours

International
Thailand
 AFF Championship (1): 2020
Thailand U-23
 Sea Games  Gold Medal (1); 2017

References

External links
 

1996 births
Living people
Picha Autra
Association football midfielders
Picha Autra
Picha Autra
Picha Autra
Picha Autra
Picha Autra
Picha Autra
Picha Autra
Picha Autra
Southeast Asian Games medalists in football
Competitors at the 2017 Southeast Asian Games